WTNB-CD, virtual channel 27 (VHF digital channel 5), is a low-powered, Class A Heartland-affiliated television station licensed to Cleveland, Tennessee, United States. The station is owned by PTP Holdings, LLC. WTNB-CD's transmitter is located on Sawyer Cemetery Road in unincorporated Mile Straight. On cable, the station is available on Charter Spectrum channel 5 and Comcast Xfinity channel 210.

History
A construction permit for a low-power television station on UHF channel 27 in Cleveland was issued on December 8, 1994 under the call sign W27BQ to North Georgia Television. On October 27, 1997, the station filed for a license to cover, which was granted on November 17. The call letters were changed to WTNB-LP on July 1, 1998; on June 12, 2003, the call sign was modified to WTNB-CA, after having been granted class A status on September 10, 2001. Under North Georgia Television, WTNB was a sister station to WDNN-CA and WDGA-CA in Dalton, Georgia; by 2005, WTNB and WDNN programmed similar lineups featuring FamilyNet and local programming, though WTNB's local programming was separate from that on WDNN.

North Georgia Television sold WTNB-CA to PTP Holdings for $350,000 in 2009. After a period off the air, WTNB resumed broadcasting under the new ownership in January 2010 as a My Family TV affiliate. On April 13, 2015, the call sign was modified to WTNB-CD, after converting to digital television in October 2014. In the FCC's incentive auction, WTNB-CD sold its spectrum for $370,099 and elected to move to a low VHF channel; the station was assigned channel 5.

Programming
In addition to Heartland network programming, original shows on the station include Nancy's Neighborhood, Man Up America (hosted by Dr. J. Adam Lowe with panelists Rob Alderman, Jenna Curtis and Tiffany Mitchell), and Hidden Treasures of the Ocoee Region.

References

External links

TNB-CD
Mass media in Bradley County, Tennessee
Television channels and stations established in 1997
1997 establishments in Tennessee